Jeremy "Jer" Lau Ying-ting (born 20 November 1992), is a Hong Kong singer, actor, and a member of the Hong Kong boy group Mirror. Apart from his group activities, Jer has also pursued a solo singing career, winning Best New Performer at the Metro Hit Awards, the Ultimate Song Chart Awards, the Chinese Gold Song Awards, and the Chill Club 20/21 Awards.

Early life 
Lau was born in Hong Kong on 20 November 1992. He attended Ng Wah Catholic Secondary School and the Hong Kong Baptist University College of International Education. In 2012, Lau formed the pop music band Bromance with his college friends, and was the band's main vocalist and bassist. In 2013, he formed the heavy metal band Joy of Stupidity, playing original Cantonese music. Lau participated in a musical class hosted by RTHK and performed as a busker for several years before transitioning to work as an entertainment reporter.

Musical career

Mirror 

In 2018, Lau quit his reporting job to audition for ViuTV's reality talent competition Good Night Show - King Maker, and finished in top 20. While only the top 10 finalists were guaranteed a contract with ViuTV, Jer managed to catch the attention of producer Ahfa Wong, who invited him to join the boy group Mirror. Jer initially declined, but was ultimately convinced. The group debuted on 3 November 2018 with the single "In a Second" .

Solo Activities 
Lau's debut single, the soft rock ballad "Tale of Water Torture" was released on 29 February 2020. "Tale of Water Torture" peaked at number three on the Ultimate 903 Chart, RTHK Chinese Pop Chart and number four on Metro Radio Pop Chart. His second single "Tale of Final Lucidity", released in August, achieved commercial success, peaking at number one on the Ultimate 903 Chart and ViuTV's Chill Club Chart. He is the eighth artist in history to have a number one single on the Ultimate 903 chart during his debut year. The release of "Tale of Wind Spirit" in October capped off what was dubbed the Trilogy of Tales.

Lau again collaborated with singer-songwriter Ng Lam Fung and lyricist Siu Hak on his fourth solo single "A Madman's Diary" released 17 March 2021. Lau remarked that "A Madman's Diary" is a tribute to legendary rock band Queen and their song "Bohemian Rhapsody", noting that he wanted to bring something unconventional into the Cantopop scene. The song is also the first of three songs forming the Rebirth Trilogy. The progressive rock single topped the Ultimate 903, the Chinese Pop Chart, and the Chill Club Chart. His fifth single, "Castle of Sand" was released on 16 July 2021. On 18 August, it peaked at number one on the Ultimate 903 music chart. On 13 October, Lau released his seventh single "Stellar Moments of Humankind". The song takes the same Chinese title as the history book Decisive Moments in History by Stefan Zweig. Produced by Carl Wong, the song serves as the conclusion to the Rebirth Trilogy.

On 26 January 2022, Lau's single "MM7" was released to streaming platforms and radio stations. The song takes its title from a newly-coined slang term "MM7" meaning awesome or fantastic, which in turn originated from a typo committed by one of Lau's fans when typing the character using Sucheng input method.

"Rules of Parting" was released on 20 April 2022, its music video being released three days later. This was followed by his tenth single "Steps to Self-Destruction" on July 11, and the eleventh single "Watching the Clouds Rise" on November 25.

Acting career 
Lau made his official acting debut in the 2020 youth sports drama We are the Littles. In 2022, Lau made his film debut in Mama's Affair directed by Kearen Pang. Filming began in August 2021 and concluded in September 2021. Lau began filming the television series Million Dollar Family in April 2022.

Filmography

Film

Television dramas

Variety shows

MV Appearance (Actor)

Discography

Singles

Featured singles

Awards and nominations
Music Awards

Movie Award

References

External links
 
 
 

1992 births
Living people
Cantopop singers
Hong Kong male singers
Hong Kong male film actors
Hong Kong male television actors
Hong Kong television personalities
21st-century Hong Kong male singers
Hong Kong idols
King Maker contestants
Mirror (group) members